Jack Hedly Wilson (born ) is a New Zealand rugby union player, currently playing with Bath in the Aviva Premiership. His regular position is winger.

Career

New Zealand Sevens

In 2012, Wilson was included in a New Zealand Sevens training squad and represented them during the 2011–12 IRB Sevens World Series, making his debut at the 2012 Hong Kong Sevens tournament in March of that year.

Bay of Plenty

He returned to the 15-man version of the game and played for his local side  during the 2012 ITM Cup. He made a total of eight appearances during the competition, starting five of those but failing to score any tries for his side as they finished in sixth spot in the competition.

Saracens

At the end of 2012, Wilson made the move to England to join English Premiership side Saracens. He made his debut for Saracens in the 19–11 victory over the Cardiff Blues in the Anglo-Welsh Cup, coming on as a first-half substitute and made a further two appearances in the same competition, starting their match against Worcester Warriors and playing off the bench against the Sale Sharks.

He made his English Premiership debut during the 2013–14 English Premiership season. He made two substitute appearances against Harlequins and London Wasps before getting his first start in their match against the Sale Sharks and marking the occasion by scoring his first senior try for the club shortly after half-time in a 24–19 victory. He repeated his try-scoring feat in their next match against Leicester Tigers, taking just five minutes to get on the scoresheet, and scored one further try in the final round of matches in the pool stage, a 31–27 defeat against the same opposition, making a total of nine appearances during the competition and starting five of those to help his side finish top of the log. However, he didn't feature in the play-offs, with Saracens reaching the final where they lost 24–20 to the Northampton Saints after extra time. In addition to playing in the Premiership, Wilson also started all five of Saracens' matches during the 2013–14 LV Cup competition, scoring two tries as the side reached the semi-finals of the competition.

Wilson played two matches for Saracens in the 2014–15 LV Cup competition, scoring a try against Harlequins, but failed to make any appearances for the side in the 2014–15 English Premiership competition.

Sharks

Bath
On 4 October 2016, Wilson returns to England as he signed for Bath in the Aviva Premiership for the remainder of the 2016–17 season.

References

External links
ESPN Profile

New Zealand rugby union players
Living people
1989 births
Rugby union players from Tauranga
Rugby union wings
Bay of Plenty rugby union players
Saracens F.C. players
Sharks (rugby union) players
Male rugby sevens players
Otago rugby union players
Highlanders (rugby union) players
New Zealand expatriate rugby union players
Expatriate rugby union players in South Africa
New Zealand expatriate sportspeople in South Africa
Bath Rugby players